The Kop Pass is a high mountain pass 
situated on the Mount Kop in Bayburt Province in easternn Turkey.

It is difficukt to keep the pass open to traffic in winter time due to snow and fog in harsh weather conditions. The Mount Kop Tunnel, which is being built west of the pass, bypasses the Kop Pass enabling also a shortcut. A monument of the Mount Kop Defense National Historic Park is situated on the summit of the mountain.

References 

Mountain passes of Turkey
Landforms of Bayburt Province